Destiny's Child was an American girl group whose final and best-known line-up comprised Beyoncé Knowles, Kelly Rowland, and Michelle Williams. Formed in 1990 in Houston, Texas, Destiny's Child members began their musical endeavors as Girl's Tyme, comprising, among others, Knowles, Rowland, LaTavia Roberson and LeToya Luckett. After years of limited success, they were signed in 1996 to Columbia Records as Destiny's Child. The group was launched into mainstream recognition following the 1999 release of their best-selling second album, The Writing's on the Wall, which contained the number-one singles "Bills, Bills, Bills" and "Say My Name". Their third album, Survivor, which contains themes the public interpreted as a channel to the group's experience, contains the worldwide hits "Independent Women", "Survivor" and "Bootylicious". In 2002, they announced a hiatus and re-united two years later for the release of their fourth and final studio album, Destiny Fulfilled (2004). Destiny's Child has sold more than 60 million records worldwide to date. Billboard magazine ranks the group as the ninth most successful artist/band of the 2000s, and placed the group 68th in its All-Time Hot 100 Artists list in 2008.

American Music Awards

ARTISTdirect ADOMA Awards

BET Awards

Billboard

Billboard Music Awards

Billboard R&B/Hip-Hop Awards

Blockbuster Entertainment Awards

Bravo Awards

BRIT Awards
The BRIT Awards are the British Phonographic Industry's annual pop music awards.

Capital FM Awards

ECHO Awards

Edison Awards

EMMA Awards

Glamour Awards

Grammy Awards

Guinness World Records

Hollywood Walk of Fame

Houston Press Music Awards

IFPI Hong Kong Top Sales Music Awards

IFPI Platinum Europe Award

International Dance Music Award

Japan Gold Disc Award

Japan Radio Popular Disks Award

J-Wave Tokio Hot 100 Award

McDonald's

Dutch Mobo Awards
The first annual Dutch MOBO Awards was introduced in 2004 as a counterpart to the MOBO Awards of United Kingdom. Destiny's Child won one award.

MOBO Awards (U.K.)

MTV

MTV Asia Music Awards

MTV Video Music Awards

MTV Japan Video Music Awards

MTV TRL Award

NAACP Image Awards

Nickelodeon Australian Kids' Choice Awards

Nickelodeon Kids' Choice Awards

NRJ Awards

NRJ Radio Awards

Radio Disney Music Awards

Radio Music Awards

RTHK International Pop Poll

Rock the Vote Award

Smass Hits Poll Party

Soul Train

Soul Train Music Awards

Soul Train Lady of Soul Awards

Teen Choice Awards

Telecom Mobile Music Awards
The Telecom Mobile Music Awards New Zealand were presented to international and local record labels for the top 20 songs that Telecom mobile users had downloaded, as either a ringtone or caller tune, starting in 2005.

TMF Awards

TMF Belgium Awards

TMF Netherlands Awards

Top of the Pops Awards

Vh1 Awards

Vh1/Vogue Fashion Awards

Vibe of the Year Awards

World Music Awards

Young Hollywood Hall of Fame
The Young Hollywood Hall of Fame is a history of the greatest all-time young entertainers of each era from 1908 to the present. The Hall of Fame pays tribute to the biggest young stars in motion pictures, television, music and radio. Each year the top young stars between an average age range of 5–21 years old are inducted into the Hall of Fame.

See also
 List of awards and nominations received by Beyoncé
 List of awards and nominations received by Kelly Rowland
 List of awards and nominations received by Michelle Williams

References

Awards and nominations
Lists of awards received by American musician
Lists of awards received by musical group